The Gibraltar Second Division was the second tier of football in the British Overseas Territory of Gibraltar, run by the Gibraltar Football Association (GFA). The league was founded in 1909 after the expansion of the Gibraltar Premier Division and as of the 2016-17 season contains 10 clubs. All of the sides competing are amateur. Teams in this division, along with the Gibraltar U-15 national team, enter the Rock Cup in the first round except for 3 clubs who receive byes to the second round.

Promotion was not regular until 2007-08 due to the prevalence of reserve teams in the division. As of the 2016-17 season, league champions are automatically promoted, and the runners up enter a play-off with the second-from-bottom team in the Gibraltar Premier Division. However, in the 2014-15 season, the top two teams were automatically promoted with no relegation, due to the Premier Division expanding to 10 teams for the 2015-16 season onward. Until 2008, a Third Division also operated in which teams were regularly promoted and relegated between the two divisions.

In 2019 the league merged with the Gibraltar Premier Division to form the Gibraltar National League, ending 110 years of second division football on the Rock.

Second Division 2018-19

List of champions
All results from RSSSF archives. Bold indicates the team was promoted. Records before 1998 are unknown.

References

External links
Gibraltar FA

 
2
Defunct second level football leagues in Europe
1909 establishments in Gibraltar
Sports leagues established in 1909
2019 disestablishments in Gibraltar
Sports leagues disestablished in 2019